Shahrestan-e Sofla (also Romanized as Shahrestān-e Soflá; also known as Shahrestān-e Pā’īn) is a village in Rudbar-e Shahrestan Rural District, Alamut-e Gharbi District, Qazvin County, Qazvin Province, Iran. At the 2006 census, its population was 515, in 120 families.

References 

Populated places in Qazvin County